Then Came You is a half-hour sitcom that aired on ABC for two months from March 22 to April 26, 2000. The show dealt with the romantic relationship between a young man and an older woman. It starred Susan Floyd, Thomas Newton, and Desmond Askew.

This was not the first time ABC greenlighted a sitcom with this title; Then Came You was also the proposed title for the show that ultimately became the 1980s sitcom Webster (only used before its premiere).

Cast
 Susan Floyd as Billie Thornton
 Thomas Newton as Aidan Wheeler
 Miriam Shor as Cheryl Sominsky
 Desmond Askew as Ed
 Colin Ferguson as Lewis Peters
 Winston J. Rochas as Manuel

Episodes

References

External links

2000 American television series debuts
2000 American television series endings
2000s American sitcoms
American Broadcasting Company original programming
Television series by 20th Century Fox Television
Television shows set in Chicago